Jack Crabtree may refer to:
 Jack Crabtree (American football)
 Jack Crabtree (artist)